Isabel is a city in Barber County, Kansas, United States.  As of the 2020 census, the population of the city was 68.

History
Isabel was founded in 1887. Isabel was named for the daughter of a surveyor.

Geography
Isabel is located at  (37.468706, -98.551325).

Isabel is located on the north county line, on the Mulvane extension of the Santa Fe, in Valley township.

Demographics

2010 census
At the 2010 census there were 90 people in 40 households, including 23 families, in the city. The racial makup of the city was 96.7% White, 2.2% from other races, and 1.1% from two or more races. Hispanic or Latino of any race were 4.4%.

Of the 40 households 22.5% had children under the age of 18 living with them, 52.5% were married couples living together, 5.0% had a female householder with no husband present, and 42.5% were non-families. 37.5% of households were one person and 7.5% were one person aged 65 or older. The average household size was 2.25 and the average family size was 3.00.

The median age was 37.5 years. 21.1% of residents were under the age of 18; 6.8% were between the ages of 18 and 24; 32.3% were from 25 to 44; 22.3% were from 45 to 64; and 17.8% were 65 or older. The gender makeup of the city was 42.2% male and 57.8% female.

2000 census
At the 2000 census there were 108 people in 46 households, including 31 families, in the city. The racial makup of the city was 93.52% White, 1.85% African American, 0.93% Native American, 0.93% from other races, and 2.78% from two or more races. Hispanic or Latino of any race were 0.93%.

Of the 46 households 26.1% had children under the age of 18 living with them, 67.4% were married couples living together, and 32.6% were non-families. 30.4% of households were one person and 21.7% were one person aged 65 or older. The average household size was 2.35 and the average family size was 2.94.

The age distribution was 22.2% under the age of 18, 10.2% from 18 to 24, 19.4% from 25 to 44, 31.5% from 45 to 64, and 16.7% 65 or older. The median age was 44 years. For every 100 females, there were 86.2 males. For every 100 females age 18 and over, there were 82.6 males.

The median household income was $23,125 and the median family income  was $27,917. Males had a median income of $24,375 versus $19,375 for females. The per capita income for the city was $12,795. There were 18.5% of families and 17.0% of the population living below the poverty line, including 36.4% of under eighteens and 6.9% of those over 64.

References

Further reading

External links
 Isabel - Directory of Public Officials
 USD 254, local school district
 Isabel, Barber County, Kansas Barber County, Kansas: History and Genealogy
 Isabel city map, KDOT

Cities in Kansas
Cities in Barber County, Kansas
1887 establishments in Kansas
Populated places established in 1887